Club Deportivo y Social Tampico Madero is a Mexican professional football club based in Tampico, Tamaulipas that plays in the Liga Premier de México.

History

Origins: CD Tampico
The club was  founded on July 8, 1945 soon after the club played a promotion match that would determine if the clubs acceptance in the Mexican Primera División against León match that ended in a 3–2 victory for the club. The first squad was made up by Goalkeeper, Eduardo Delgado, Humberto Escamilla, Florencio Carranza, Ernesto Olivares, Víctor Cardín, Teódulo Azuara, Fidel Menéndez, Carlos Pego and the Argentinians Juan José Sosa, Teodolindo Mourin nickname Pibe and Ernesto Candia,  with José Castro el viejo noy, been the first manager in the club's history The first board of directors was made out by President Carlos González Avin and vice-president Alejandro Luna

It was on August 8, 1945 when the club officially join the Mexican Primera División building that same year the Parque España stands now. The club's first official game was played in the 1945–46 tournament against Atlante were the club suffered its first loss with an outrageous score of 10–3. The club won its first game on September 30 the same year against Atlas 3–2 first goals scored by Ernesto Olivares.The club finished that year 11th out 16. The club played mediocre tournaments the following years finishing last in the 1948–49 tournament and 9th in the  1949–50 tournament.

The club started off the 1950s in the same way they had been playing in the 1940s gaining a 9th, 6th place from 1950–52 tournaments. It was until the 1952–53 tournament when the team came together and finished 1st obtains for its first league title. It was won with 14 victories, 6 draws and only 2 losses for a total of 34, a then league record. The club would go on to win the title Campeón de Campeones after defeating Puebla who had won that year's Copa México with a score of 3–0.

Roster from the 1952–53 championship club were.

The club's last notable achievement from 1954–57 when they finished 4th in 1954, 7th in 1955, 6th in 1956, 10th in 1957. In 1958, they finished last and were relegated to Segundo División. They played 1 year and were returned to Mexican Primera División.

The club started out the 1960s with 3 bad consecutive league tournaments but manage to win its only Copa México title in 1961 against Toluca. Nonetheless the club would eventually once again be relegated in 1962–63 tournament. The club played in the second division in the 1960s coming up short in the 1964–65.

tournament after finishing tied for first place with Jabatos de nuevol leon having played a decisive match that the club would go on to loss match played in León Guanajuato. The city of Tampico did not wait along for club to be promoted and so founded Petroleros de Ciudad Madero who would represent the city of Tampico in the first division in the 1960s and early 1970s till the club folded in 1975 after the club's relegation.

The club would go on to play most of the 1970s in the second division till 1977 when the club bought out the San Luis club. The club that played in the second division was sold to Universidad de Guadalajara and became Bachilleres a reserve squad. The club had a good tournament in its first year back reaching the semi finalist again Pumas which they would go on to loss that year. The following year the club finished 14th overall and did not reach the play-off spots. In the 1979–80 tournament the club finished 7th and managed to qualified to the play-off group stage where they lost once again and so came the end of the 1970s..

In the 1980–81 tournament the club finished 15th in the league and failed to qualify to the play-off round after having a good tournament the year before. The following year in the 1981–82 tournament the club had a terrible year and so was relegated for the third time after the club played a promotion 3 game play-off relegation series against Atlas the first game went to Atlas, the scoundrel game was one by Tampico and a third game in neutral ground was won by Atlas.

Soon after the club's relegation the city decided to buy out yet another franchise this time buying struggling club in order for the club to remain in the top division. This club was made up from players from the Atletas Campesinos and some from the Club that had been relegated. That year the club struggled once again finishing 14 in the league. The following year the club would earn a 9th place.

Tampico Madero
In 1985 due to the 1986 FIFA World Cup held in Mexico the tournament was split into two short tournaments the Prod85 and Mexico 86. In the Prod 85 the club finished 1st in group 1 and qualifying to the play-off series. In the Quarter-finals the club defeated Cruz Azul 4–2. In Semi-finals the club defeated Puebla 5–4. In the finals the club went up against Club América, managing to beat America 4–1 in the first match but following 4–1 in the second. In the Mexico 86 the club would once again reach the finals this time after defeating Atletico Morelia in Quarter-finals, Club América in Semi-finals. The club would go up against Monterrey in the finals winning the first match 2–1 but once again losing the second match 2–0 and once again finishing runner up. The club would qualify to the play-off again in the 1988–89 tournament. This time a short tournament play-off round was played with clubs Cruz Azul, Pumas de la UNAM and Atlante, the club would finish 1 point behind Cruz Azul who would go on to final against Club América. The following year the club finished 19th overall and worst was to come when the club was bought out by Querétaro F.C. and moved to Querétaro and so came an end to the 1980s.

In 1991, Antonio Pélaez Pier bought the Atlético Potosino franchise to return Tampico Madero to competitions, the team was registered in the Segunda División, in 1994 this team was promoted to the First Division after defeating Irapuato in the championship final.

In the 1994-95 season the team played in the First Division, however, in the middle of the season the club was moved to Querétaro City and renamed Gallos Blancos TM, due to problems between the team owner and the oil workers' union, the stadium owners.

After 1995, the team came and went on several occasions, playing mainly in the Primera División 'A'. Between 1995 and 1998 the team was a subsidiary of Club Puebla. In 2001, Águilas de Tamaulipas was promoted from the Second Division and took the name of Tampico Madero, however, the team only played one year until it was moved to La Piedad due to lack of support from local businessmen.

In 2005 the team returned to compete in the Primera División 'A', now as part of the sports structure of Atlante F.C., Tampico Madero served as the team's subsidiary for a few years and later as an independent club, however, in 2009 it was dissolved due to the reform of the league that established requirements that the club could not meet. The club was able to continue playing in the third level of Mexican football, because it kept its subsidiary squad that took part in that league and became the main team.

In 2010, the team merged with Universidad del Fútbol, and became part of the sports structure of C.F. Pachuca, for which Tampico Madero received some youth soccer players from this club. In the Torneo Independencia 2010, the team was runner-up in the league after being defeated by Celaya. In 2014 the club became independent from Pachuca.

In 2015 the Grupo Tecamachalco took charge of the club with Javier San Román as president, in the Clausura 2016 tournament the team won the championship of its division and played the promotion play-off against Potros UAEM, where it was defeated.

In the summer of 2016 Grupo Tecamachalco signed an agreement with Grupo Orlegi, with this document Tampico Madero obtained a franchise in Ascenso MX, the second category of Mexican football, however the team was officially renamed as TM Fútbol Club. In 2018 Grupo Tecamachalco abandoned the operation of the club due to the possible elimination of the right of promotion for the clubs of the Ascenso MX to the Liga MX. After this event, Tampico Madero continued in the league, but became a training team for Santos Laguna and Atlas, the Orlegi clubs that participate in the Liga MX.

In the spring of 2020, Ascenso MX was in a financial crisis derived from COVID-19 and the loss of television income and fans suffered by the clubs, therefore, the league became a youth soccer development tournament and promotion to Liga MX was abolished in exchange for member clubs receiving financial aid from teams in the highest category of Mexican football. The league was renamed as Liga de Expansión MX.

In December 2020, Tampico Madero became the first Liga de Expansión champion after defeating Atlante F.C. in the final. In May 2021 the team lost the champions trophy against Tepatitlán F.C. In December 2021, the team was runner-up in the league after falling to Atlante, in a repeat of the 2020 final.

At the end of 2021, problems began to arise between Grupo Orlegi and the oil workers' union due to the worse state of the Estadio Tamaulipas, since both parties accused each other of not taking charge of the maintenance of the property, this increased after the stadium was closed by the municipal government due to its poor conditions.

On April 20, 2022, Grupo Orlegi announced the end of the TM Fútbol Club franchise, which meant a new demise for the club. The next day the purchase of the franchise was announced by businessman Arturo Lomelí, who decided to move the club to La Paz, Baja California Sur and rename it Club Atlético La Paz.

After the end of the TM Fútbol Club franchise, local businessmen began efforts to bring a new team to the city. On June 22, 2022, the new project was officially presented, the team was renamed Club Deportivo y Social Tampico Madero and will participate in the Liga Premier de México starting in the 2022–23 season. The new team emerged after acquiring the Atlético Reynosa franchise, which had been on hiatus since 2020. Enrique Badillo will be the president of the club and Gastón Obledo the manager.

Year by year statistics

After this season Querétaro bought the Tampico - Madero franchise.
Also after this season the team with the worst point percentage in the
last three seasons will be relegated.

Past kits
First kit evolution

Past kits part 2
First kit evolution

Stadium

CDS Tampico Madero play their home matches at the Estadio Tamaulipas in Tampico & Ciudad Madero, Tamaulipas. The stadium capacity is 19,369 people. Its owned by STPRM, and its surface is covered by natural grass. The stadium was opened in 1966.

Personnel

Coaching staff

Players

First-team squad

Honours
Primera División:
Runner-up (2): Prode '85, Mexico '86

Segunda División de México:
Champion (1): 1993–94

Liga de Expansión MX:
Champion (1): Guardianes 2020

Notable former players
  Pablo Bocco
  Esteban González
  Marco Sandy
  David Álvarez Agudelo 
  Jorge Contreras
  Kevin Harbottle
  Mauricio Cienfuegos
  Mario Acevedo
  Joaquín del Olmo
  Alex Dominguez
  Benjamín Galindo
  Diego de Buen
  Ezequiel Gallifa 
  Héctor Miguel Herrera
  Miguel Ángel Herrera
  Sergio Lira
  Hugo Pineda
  Alejandro Ramírez
  Luis Reyes 
  Ignacio Torres
  René Mendieta
  Curt Onalfo
  William Yarbrough
  Ruben Romeo Corbo
  Bosco Frontán
  Víctor Hugo Lojero Alexanderson
  Marc Crosas
  Javier Orozco
  Junior Lacayo
  Mynor Escoe
  Jair Pereira

Notable former managers
  Carlos Reinoso
  José Luis Saldívar
  Francisco Fernández
  Carlos Miloc
  Sergio Almirón

References

 
Football clubs in Tamaulipas
1945 establishments in Mexico
Association football clubs established in 1945